Schwartziella rectilinea is a species of minute sea snail, a marine gastropod mollusk or micromollusk in the family Zebinidae. The specific name is Latin for straight lined, and refers to the numerous axial ribs of this species.

Description
The height of the shell attains 3.8 mm.

Distribution
This species occurs in the Atlantic Ocean off the Cape Verdes.

References

 Rolán E., 2005. Malacological Fauna From The Cape Verde Archipelago. Part 1, Polyplacophora and Gastropoda.

rectilinea
Gastropods of Cape Verde
Gastropods described in 2000